Zingiberene synthase (EC 4.2.3.65, α-zingiberene synthase, ZIS) is an enzyme with systematic name (2E,6E)-farnesyl-diphosphate diphosphate-lyase (zingiberene-forming). This enzyme catalyses the following chemical reaction

 (2E,6E)-farnesyl diphosphate  zingiberene + diphosphate

References

External links 
 

EC 4.2.3